Martey is a surname. Notable people with the surname include:

Daisy Martey, British singer-songwriter
Joe Martey (born 1944), Ghanaian boxer
Nathaniel Martey (born 1976), Ghanaian sprinter
Robert Martey (born 1984), Ghanaian long jumper
Simon Martey (born 1990), Ghanaian footballer